The World Aquatics Junior Swimming Championships (or "Junior Worlds") is an international swimming championship event organized biennially by World Aquatics for girls who are aged 14–17 and boys who are aged 15–18 on the 31st December of the year of the competition. It is usually held on odd years. Prior to 2023, the event was known as the FINA World Junior Swimming Championships.

Editions

Medal table
Last updated after the 2022 Championships

Championships records

All records were set in finals unless noted otherwise. All times are swum in a long-course (50m) pool.

Men

Women

Mixed

See also
 FINA World Junior Diving Championships
 Swimming at the Youth Olympic Games

References

 
Recurring sporting events established in 2006
Junior
World youth sports competitions
International swimming competitions
Youth swimming